Poecilocoris lewisi, known as the clown stink bug, is a species of shield bug found in eastern Asia.

References

Scutelleridae
Insects described in 1883